Ali Davoudi (born March 22, 1999 in Tehran) is an Iranian weightlifter who won a gold medal at the 2016 Youth World Championships in the +94 kg weight division. He is the 2018 Junior world champion and currently holds the junior world records for the Snatch and Total in the +109 kg class.

Major results

References

External links

Ali Davoudi on Instagram

1999 births
Living people
Iranian male weightlifters
Place of birth missing (living people)
Weightlifters at the 2020 Summer Olympics
Olympic weightlifters of Iran
Medalists at the 2020 Summer Olympics
Olympic silver medalists for Iran
Olympic medalists in weightlifting
20th-century Iranian people
21st-century Iranian people